Sarah Patterson (born 1972) is an English actress.

Sarah Patterson may also refer to:

 Sarah Patterson (born 1959), English author and daughter of author Jack Higgins
 Sarah Patterson (coach), Alabama Crimson Tide gymnastics team coach